Eduardo Ramos (born 11 June 1953) is a Salvadoran former swimmer. He competed in the men's 100 metre breaststroke at the 1968 Summer Olympics.

References

1953 births
Living people
Salvadoran male swimmers
Olympic swimmers of El Salvador
Swimmers at the 1968 Summer Olympics
Sportspeople from San Salvador